Top Secret is a 1952 British black and white comedy film directed by Mario Zampi and starring George Cole, Oskar Homolka and Nadia Gray. A sanitation inspector is mistaken for an international spy. It was shot at the Elstree Studios of Associated British. The film's sets were designed by the art director Ivan King. The film was released in the United States as Mr. Potts Goes to Moscow.

Plot
George Potts, a plumber in a top secret government research plant, accidentally comes into possession of the plans for a revolutionary atomic weapon. As George leaves for his annual holiday, the research security team embarks on a nationwide search for the hapless 'sanitary engineer'. Meanwhile, the Russians get wind of the incident and intercept George, plying him with liquor and employment promises so that he'll hand over the plans to them. All the while, George never knows what the fuss is about: he thinks that the British and Soviet authorities are interested in his new plans for a modern ballcock system he is carrying. The Russians offer him a job in the Kremlin doing research (on plumbing, he believes), and steal his ballcock plans.

They put George in prison and interrogate him, using a truth drug, but although he tells them truthfully that he hid the plans in the lining of Tania's coat, they have disappeared, because they are in Zekov's coat lining.

While there he falls in love with secret agent Tania, and discovers the true nature of the plans he is carrying.

George organises a flight to East Berlin where Zekov is waiting, unaware that he is carrying the plans.

Cast

 George Cole as George Potts
 Oskar Homolka as Zekov
 Nadia Gray as Tania Ivanova
 Frederick Valk as Rakov
 Wilfrid Hyde-White as Sir Hubert Wells
 Geoffrey Sumner as Pike
 Ronald Adam as Barworth Controller
 Ernest Jay as Prof. Layton
 Edwin Styles as Barworth Superintendent
 Richard Wattis as Barnes
 Michael Medwin as Smedley
 Eleanor Summerfield as Cecilia
 Irene Handl as Mrs. Tidmarsh
 Phyllis Morris as Mrs. Tweedy
 Charles Goldner as Gaston
 Ina De La Haye as Madame
 Ronnie Stevens as Aubrey
 Olaf Pooley as Professor Roblettski
 Kynaston Reeves as Barworth Director
 Frederick Leister as Prime Minister
 Henry Hewitt as Minister of Health
 Gibb McLaughlin as Schoolmaster
 Michael Balfour as Jersey Sailor
 Walter Horsbrugh as 1st Cabinet Minister
 Anthony Shaw as 2nd Cabinet Minister
 Tim Turner as 1st Reporter
 Hal Osmond as Jersey Waiter
 Myrtle Reed as Jersey Air Hostess
 David Hurst as Deutsch
 Bernard Rebel as Trubiev
 Guido Lorraine as 1st M.V.D.
 Terence Alexander as 2nd M.V.D.
 Richard Marner as Russian Sentry
 Martin Boddey as Russian Security Officer
 Gerard Heinz as Russian Director of Plant
 Fred Berger as Russian Doctor
 Victor Maddern as British N.C.O.
 Reed De Rouen as 1st U.S. Soldier
 Johnny Catcher as 2nd U.S. Soldier
 Willoughby Gray as British Officer
 Christopher Lee as Russian Agent
 Stanislaus Zienciakiewicz as Joseph Stalin
 Anton Diffring as East German policeman

Critical reception
The New York Times noted, "as long as the action stays this side of the Iron Curtain, the production is enjoyable—and understandable — but once entangled with the enigma of Communist rule, the farce ends."

Allmovie wrote, "no one takes Top Secret seriously--certainly not Oscar Homolka, who delivers a bravura performance as a Russian secret agent who wistfully yearns for the glories of the Czarist days."

References

External links

1952 films
1950s spy comedy films
British comedy films
Cold War films
Cold War spy films
Films directed by Mario Zampi
Films shot at Associated British Studios
1952 comedy films
British black-and-white films
1950s English-language films
Films set in London
Films set in Kent
Films set in the Channel Islands
Films set in Paris
Films set in Moscow
Films set in Berlin
1950s British films